Mamam is a common Togolese surname. Notable people with the surname include:

Chérif Touré Mamam (born 1978), Togolese footballer
Souleymane Mamam (born 1985), Togolese footballer